CompuBox is the name of a computerized punches scoring system run by two operators. CompuBox is used in boxing matches around the world.

Background
The system is based on a computer program, originally named FightStat, developed by Jon Gibbs in 1984–85 when Gibbs worked with Logan Hobson and Robert Canobbio at Sports Information Data Base (SIDB), of Hasbrouck Heights, New Jersey.

Gibbs was the developer of TenniSTAT, the first computer-generated statistics program for tennis, which was used by the US Open, Wimbledon, the Australian Open, and other major tournaments.

At Hobson & Canobbio's request, Gibbs wrote the code for FightStat (also called PunchStat in some venues) and was used at Madison Square Garden's Felt Forum and in Reno for the 1985 HBO Boxing telecast of the Livingstone Bramble-Ray Mancini rematch for the WBA's world Lightweight title. 

After SIDB went bankrupt in 1985, Hobson and Canobbio renamed the program CompuBox and founded CompuBox Inc. Hobson later left the company in 2002.

CompuBox's purpose is to settle controversies surrounding fights by counting each punch thrown by each of the fighters, and also each punch landed, to provide fight viewers with a final punchstat count and a perception of who should ideally be given the judges' decision, in the cases where a fight lasts the full distance.

The system calls for two operators. Each operator watches one of the two fighters and has access to four keys, corresponding to jab connect, jab miss, power punch connect, and power punch miss. The operators key in the different punches as they happen, collecting punch counts and hit percentages along the way.

CompuBox is used by HBO, NBC and ESPN. Former world champion Genaro Hernandez was one of the men in charge of operating the system.

References

Sources
"Compubox Online"
Jones, Robert. "Interview With the Owner of CompuBox: Bob Canobbio", Mike Marley's FightNightNews.com, accessed February 12, 2008.
Perry, Kevin. "Fight Report Exclusive-Compubox Interview", Fight Report, accessed February 12, 2008.

Boxing
Sports software